The Front Party  (abbreviated FRONTAS) was a socialist political party in Lithuania established in 2008 by Algirdas Paleckis. It participated in the 2008 Lithuanian parliamentary elections but failed to reach the 5% cutoff and sent no members to the Seimas.

On December 19, 2009 the party merged with the Lithuanian Socialist Party to establish a new political party, the Socialist People's Front.

Ideology 

The party is considered socialist, clearly advancing leftist values and advocating reforms to the Lithuanian Constitution. The party supports an interventionist policy on economic matters ("The market must be regulated and limited").

The party promised during the parliamentary elections to reduce the number of Seimas members to 121 and to expand the powers of the president.

Socialist People's Front 

On December 19, 2009, the Front Party merged with the Lithuanian Socialist Party at a meeting in Vilnius. The new party was named the "Socialist People's Front". At the meeting, held at Vilnius University, 102 party delegates participated. In voting for the merger, 96 delegates were in favor, three against, and one abstained. The new party was registered at the Ministry of Justice, and its ideology is democratic socialist.

Notable members 
Algirdas Paleckis, leader of the party from its creation to dissolution
Audrius Butkevičius (2008-2009), one of the most active members, former minister of National Defence

References

External links 
 Official website

Defunct political parties in Lithuania

pl:Socjalistyczny Front Ludowy